The Abbey Series of British novels by Elsie J. Oxenham comprises 38 titles which were published between 1914 and 1959. The first title, Girls of the Hamlet Club set the scene for the school aspects of the series, but it is the second title, The Abbey Girls, that introduces The Abbey – almost a character within the series in its own right – a romantic ruin that inspires love for it as a quiet, peaceful place, and creates the wish to behave in the public-spirited tradition of the early Cistercian monks. These qualities go some way towards explaining the popularity of the series.

Elsie Oxenham's Abbey Series
Girls of the Hamlet Club (1914) is set in Miss Macey's school in Wycombe and in the surrounding hamlets and villages. It tells how Cicely Hobart comes to Whiteleaf to be near her maternal grandparents. She has been living in a London suburb, but will now board with an old family servant, and go to school in Wycombe. She finds that the school is split into two sets, the 'real school' and the 'hamlets'  who are mainly girls who have come to the school on scholarships, but live in the country hamlets, and cannot afford extras like the clubs, which set high subscriptions to keep them out. Cicely organises the outsiders into The Hamlet Club with a motto 'To be or not to be' from Shakespeare's Hamlet and the Whiteleaf Cross, a local landmark, as their badge. As the club develops, its members learn Morris and Country Dancing, and prepare a May Queen ceremony for Cicely's grandparents. The Hamlet Club comes to the rescue of the school when the leading actors in the school play come down with measles; they sacrifice their secret for the good of the school and Miriam Honor is crowned as the first Queen.

The Abbey Girls (1920) is the second title of the series, and tells of two red-headed cousins, Joan and Joy Shirley, and how, in different ways, they manage to get places at Miss Macey's School. These two characters are the original 'Abbey Girls' and the series continues with stories about them and the friends they make throughout, not only their schooldays, but also their adult lives. An early friend, Jen Robins, soon becomes a major character, and others, Jandy Mac, Rosamund and Maidlin, can all claim the sobriquet 'Abbey Girl'. By the end of the series these six are all married with children, and the adventures of the daughters of Joan, Joy, Jandy and Jen, at the same school, have come to the fore. 
  
There was no 'Abbey School' as such, although The Girls of the Abbey School (1921) tells how the school spent a term in Abinger Hall, the home of Joy Shirley, which had the ruined abbey of Gracedieu in its grounds. The Abbey was based on Cleeve Abbey in Somerset – an English Heritage Property open to the public in the summer months. Oxenham 'moved' this ruin to Oxfordshire, near the Buckinghamshire border, for the plot of The Abbey Girls, to tie the cousins in with the characters from the first book, Girls of the Hamlet Club.

Main Abbey Series (indicating best reading order)

° = published as a Collins 'Fat Orange' 
† = published as a Collins 'Seagull' 
‡ = published as a Collins 'Small Red Abbey'
g = reprinted in paperback by Girls Gone By Publishers 
e = reprinted in paperback by The EJO Society

Notes to table 

1. Jen of the Abbey School takes place during and after the events of The Abbey Girls Go Back to School and should therefore be read immediately after it.

2. The Retrospective Titles cover the period between The Girls of The Abbey School and The Abbey Girls Go Back to School, and are probably best read in that position, while remembering that this produces a few inconsistencies with books set later, but written earlier.

3. Maid of the Abbey should be read before Jandy Mac Comes Back.

4. Guardians of the Abbey is partly concurrent with A Fiddler for the Abbey, but should ideally be read after it.

5. The first chapter of The Song of the Abbey overlaps the last of A Dancer from the Abbey.

6. N.B. Two Queens at the Abbey was only ever published as a 'Small Red Abbey'.

Abbey Connectors

Oxenham wrote several other series which tie in with the main Abbey Series; these are known as Abbey Connectors. Characters first used in other titles or series are introduced into the Abbey Series – sometimes stretching the internal chronology. A particular example of this is the character Robin (Robertina) Brent. She first appears as a 12-year-old in The Girl Who Wouldn't Make Friends, an Abbey Connector published in 1909. But she reappears as a 17 to 18-year-old in three titles: Rosamund's Tuckshop (1937), Rosamund's Castle (1938) – both in the Abbey Series – and New Girls at Wood End (1957), an Abbey Connector, as well as appearing in the book that bears her name in the Abbey Series, Robins in the Abbey (1947), when she is 21.

Oxenham also wrote about 20 books which have no connection at all with the Abbey Series; these are known as Non-Connectors.

The Author

 

Oxenham depicts herself in some books in the series as 'The Writing Person', mainly in The New Abbey Girls and The Abbey Girls Again – for more information about the author herself see the article Elsie J. Oxenham.

Themes in the series
Several themes are particularly apparent throughout the series, reflecting Oxenham's own interests and beliefs.

Folk Dancing
Oxenham was an enthusiast of folk dancing and frequently incorporated it into her work; Folk dancing is mentioned in nearly all 38 Abbey books, and the English Folk Dance Society (later the English Folk Dance and Song Society) and its leading members are depicted in some of them, some by real name, others under nicknames.

May Queens
Another theme used throughout the series was that of May Queens. The Hamlet Club [formed in the first book of the series] chose, towards the end of that book, one of their number as May Queen. By the time of Abbey Girls this has become a tradition in the school of 3 years' standing, and by the end of the series, in Two Queens at the Abbey the Club is 27 years old and crowning Joy's twin daughters as the joint 28th Queen. It is thought that the Whitelands College tradition of May Queens [latterly May Monarchs, since the college became co-ed], which was inspired by John Ruskin, may in turn have inspired Oxenham, perhaps through someone she had met who had been trained at Whitelands, but no definite connection has been established. Certainly Oxenham herself did not attend the college.

Christian Faith
Oxenham was brought up in the Congregational Church (later the United Reformed Church in England), and her beliefs and consequent philosophy of life are apparent throughout the series. Whilst she does not proselytise, her characters discuss the reasons behind good and bad happenings, and grow in their own beliefs as they do so. This allows her to give a depth to the characters that might not otherwise become apparent solely through their actions.

Elsie Jeanette Oxenham Appreciation Society
One of the interests of collectors and EJO Society members is finding and visiting the original sites used by Oxenham in her books. As well as the Bucks/Oxon area and the village of Washford, Somerset where Cleeve Abbey is situated, several books are set in parts of Sussex, Wales, Lancashire, the English Lake District and Scotland. Naturally these are not always depicted exactly as their real counterparts; Oxenham was writing fiction, and if she could move an abbey nearly 200 miles for her purposes, surely changing a few names and telescoping or stretching distances was also well within her remit.

Notes

References

Books

Web 
The Elsie J. Oxenham Society/Abbey Chronicle
Australian Abbey Girls Site
Jess Nevins. Pulp Heroes of the Pre-War Years, A (Archived 2009-10-24).

Series of children's books
Novels by Elsie J. Oxenham
British young adult novels
20th-century British children's literature
British children's novels
Young adult novel series
William Collins, Sons books